The Petrovsky constituency (No.56) was a Russian legislative constituency in Stavropol Krai in 1993–2007. The constituency covered predominantly rural districts in central Stavropol Krai. During 2015 redistricting Petrovsky constituency was eliminated and its territory was partitioned between Stavropol, Nevinnomyssk and Georgiyevsk constituencies.

Members elected

Election results

1993

|-
! colspan=2 style="background-color:#E9E9E9;text-align:left;vertical-align:top;" |Candidate
! style="background-color:#E9E9E9;text-align:left;vertical-align:top;" |Party
! style="background-color:#E9E9E9;text-align:right;" |Votes
! style="background-color:#E9E9E9;text-align:right;" |%
|-
|style="background-color:"|
|align=left|Vasily Moroz
|align=left|Agrarian Party
|
|53.92%
|-
|style="background-color:"|
|align=left|Andrey Razin
|align=left|Independent
| -
|27.90%
|-
| colspan="5" style="background-color:#E9E9E9;"|
|- style="font-weight:bold"
| colspan="3" style="text-align:left;" | Total
| 
| 100%
|-
| colspan="5" style="background-color:#E9E9E9;"|
|- style="font-weight:bold"
| colspan="4" |Source:
|
|}

1995

|-
! colspan=2 style="background-color:#E9E9E9;text-align:left;vertical-align:top;" |Candidate
! style="background-color:#E9E9E9;text-align:left;vertical-align:top;" |Party
! style="background-color:#E9E9E9;text-align:right;" |Votes
! style="background-color:#E9E9E9;text-align:right;" |%
|-
|style="background-color:"|
|align=left|Aleksandr Chernogorov
|align=left|Communist Party
|
|50.04%
|-
|style="background-color:"|
|align=left|Vasily Moroz (incumbent)
|align=left|Agrarian Party
|
|19.91%
|-
|style="background-color:"|
|align=left|Valery Panin
|align=left|Liberal Democratic Party
|
|11.13%
|-
|style="background-color:#2C299A"|
|align=left|Aleksandr Larionov
|align=left|Congress of Russian Communities
|
|10.32%
|-
|style="background-color:#000000"|
|colspan=2 |against all
|
|6.75%
|-
| colspan="5" style="background-color:#E9E9E9;"|
|- style="font-weight:bold"
| colspan="3" style="text-align:left;" | Total
| 
| 100%
|-
| colspan="5" style="background-color:#E9E9E9;"|
|- style="font-weight:bold"
| colspan="4" |Source:
|
|}

1997

|-
! colspan=2 style="background-color:#E9E9E9;text-align:left;vertical-align:top;" |Candidate
! style="background-color:#E9E9E9;text-align:left;vertical-align:top;" |Party
! style="background-color:#E9E9E9;text-align:right;" |Votes
! style="background-color:#E9E9E9;text-align:right;" |%
|-
|style="background-color:"|
|align=left|Vasily Khmyrov
|align=left|Independent
|-
|34.75%
|-
| colspan="5" style="background-color:#E9E9E9;"|
|- style="font-weight:bold"
| colspan="3" style="text-align:left;" | Total
| -
| 100%
|-
| colspan="5" style="background-color:#E9E9E9;"|
|- style="font-weight:bold"
| colspan="4" |Source:
|
|}

1999

|-
! colspan=2 style="background-color:#E9E9E9;text-align:left;vertical-align:top;" |Candidate
! style="background-color:#E9E9E9;text-align:left;vertical-align:top;" |Party
! style="background-color:#E9E9E9;text-align:right;" |Votes
! style="background-color:#E9E9E9;text-align:right;" |%
|-
|style="background-color:"|
|align=left|Anatoly Kulikov
|align=left|Independent
|
|33.97%
|-
|style="background-color:"|
|align=left|Vasily Khmyrov (incumbent)
|align=left|Communist Party
|
|20.29%
|-
|style="background-color:"|
|align=left|Viktor Boroday
|align=left|Unity
|
|8.53%
|-
|style="background-color:"|
|align=left|Dmitry Atroshchenkov
|align=left|Independent
|
|7.19%
|-
|style="background-color:"|
|align=left|Aleksandr Kapustyansky
|align=left|Independent
|
|6.39%
|-
|style="background-color:"|
|align=left|Nikolay Dushka
|align=left|Independent
|
|4.80%
|-
|style="background-color:"|
|align=left|Aleksandr Pegishev
|align=left|Independent
|
|4.76%
|-
|style="background-color:"|
|align=left|Vasily Moroz
|align=left|Independent
|
|2.38%
|-
|style="background-color:#084284"|
|align=left|Mikhail Khlynov
|align=left|Spiritual Heritage
|
|1.93%
|-
|style="background-color:#C62B55"|
|align=left|Valery Kolesnikov
|align=left|Peace, Labour, May
|
|0.64%
|-
|style="background-color:#FCCA19"|
|align=left|German Barbashov
|align=left|Congress of Russian Communities-Yury Boldyrev Movement
|
|0.62%
|-
|style="background-color:#020266"|
|align=left|Vladimir Martynenko
|align=left|Russian Socialist Party
|
|0.54%
|-
|style="background-color:#000000"|
|colspan=2 |against all
|
|5.89%
|-
| colspan="5" style="background-color:#E9E9E9;"|
|- style="font-weight:bold"
| colspan="3" style="text-align:left;" | Total
| 
| 100%
|-
| colspan="5" style="background-color:#E9E9E9;"|
|- style="font-weight:bold"
| colspan="4" |Source:
|
|}

2003

|-
! colspan=2 style="background-color:#E9E9E9;text-align:left;vertical-align:top;" |Candidate
! style="background-color:#E9E9E9;text-align:left;vertical-align:top;" |Party
! style="background-color:#E9E9E9;text-align:right;" |Votes
! style="background-color:#E9E9E9;text-align:right;" |%
|-
|style="background-color:"|
|align=left|Pavel Voronin
|align=left|Independent
|
|32.94%
|-
|style="background-color:"|
|align=left|Anatoly Kulikov (incumbent)
|align=left|United Russia
|
|30.06%
|-
|style="background-color:"|
|align=left|Yury Burlutsky
|align=left|Communist Party
|
|12.21%
|-
|style="background-color:"|
|align=left|Mikhail Khlynov
|align=left|Liberal Democratic Party
|
|4.47%
|-
|style="background-color:"|
|align=left|Valery Khuka
|align=left|Agrarian Party
|
|3.65%
|-
|style="background-color:"|
|align=left|Vitaly Zubenko
|align=left|Yabloko
|
|3.50%
|-
|style="background-color:#408080"|
|align=left|Viktor Sharkov
|align=left|For a Holy Russia
|
|1.37%
|-
|style="background-color:#000000"|
|colspan=2 |against all
|
|9.65%
|-
| colspan="5" style="background-color:#E9E9E9;"|
|- style="font-weight:bold"
| colspan="3" style="text-align:left;" | Total
| 
| 100%
|-
| colspan="5" style="background-color:#E9E9E9;"|
|- style="font-weight:bold"
| colspan="4" |Source:
|
|}

Notes

References

Obsolete Russian legislative constituencies
Politics of Stavropol Krai